Colour Me Free! is the fourth studio album by English singer and songwriter Joss Stone, released on 20 October 2009 by Virgin Records. The album was originally scheduled to be released in April 2009. However, Stone's record label, EMI, delayed it to July and again to 20 October. "Free Me" was released on 22 September 2009 as the only single from the album. In the United States, the album's physical and digital releases were made available exclusively through Target and iTunes, respectively. Colour Me Free! features guest appearances by Raphael Saadiq, Nas, Jeff Beck, Sheila E., David Sanborn and Jamie Hartman from Ben's Brother.

Despite some criticism towards its ballads, the album was met with generally positive reviews from music critics, who lauded its sonic direction and Stone's vocals. Colour Me Free! peaked at number 75 on the UK Albums Chart, becoming Stone's lowest-peaking album in the United Kingdom. It debuted at number 10 on the US Billboard 200, selling 27,000 units in its first week. The song "4 and 20" was included on the soundtrack to the 2010 romantic comedy film Valentine's Day.

Background and recording
Stone began writing songs with Jonathan Shorten and Conner Reeves in Devon in early 2008. Since they did not have a studio or any musicians, she paid a visit to Mama Stone's, a music venue that her mother was building at an old house in Wellington, Somerset, using the downstairs level as a performance space and the upstairs portion as writing rooms and a recording studio. After noticing a vocal booth recently finished by construction crews, Stone was inspired to record an album. "I woke up the next day and it was like, 'I want to make an album and I don't want to think about it, I don't want to collect songs. I want to make it—now!'", Stone said.

Stone called her assistant and asked for her touring musicians, who flew from the United States to Devon the following day. Along with Reeves, Shorten and her band, Stone spent "an intense week of creation" at Mama Stone's. "We wrote the song and then we rehearsed it for, like, a little minute, and then we recorded it and then we wrote another one and recorded it. We didn't sit down and say, 'OK, how would we want this album to represent Joss? What songs are we going to choose? and blah, blah, blah ...' It wasn't any of that", Stone explained. She also enlisted guest musicians such as rapper Nas, guitarist Jeff Beck, percussionist Sheila E. and saxophonist David Sanborn.

Release and promotion

Stone performed the song "Governmentalist" during voter registration group HeadCount's "Get Out the Vote Party" at the Highline Ballroom in New York City on 3 November 2008. The track was released as a free download on Stone's and HeadCount's respective websites. On 19 February 2009, Stone kicked off a promotional tour across the United Kingdom at Mama Stone's. The tour included concerts in Darlington, Bristol, Birmingham, Leeds, Glasgow, Liverpool, Manchester and Dover, and concluded on 4 March.

In the United States, Stone supported the album with performances at the 2009 Coachella Valley Music and Arts Festival on 18 April 2009, at Club Nokia in Los Angeles on 23 April and at the Beach Rescue Concert in Asbury Park, New Jersey, on 29 August. She later announced European tour dates, visiting countries such as Germany, the Netherlands, Austria, Sweden, Poland, Portugal and Greece between June and September 2009. From 21 to 23 November 2009, she performed three shows in the Brazilian cities of Rio de Janeiro, São Paulo and Porto Alegre, respectively. Stone then returned to Europe in February and March 2010 for an additional run of tour dates.

"Free Me" was released on 22 September 2009 as the only single from Colour Me Free!. Stone performed "Free Me" and a cover of Dusty Springfield's "Son of a Preacher Man" on Dancing with the Stars on 29 September 2009. She also performed "Free Me" on Jimmy Kimmel Live! on 1 October 2009 and on Live! with Regis and Kelly on 9 October. Stone appeared live on Later... with Jools Holland on 10 November 2009, performing "Free Me" and "Incredible". On 13 November, she performed "Free Me", "I Believe It to My Soul" and "Parallel Lines" on the hour-long, pre-recorded edition of Later... with Jools Holland.

On 16 November 2009, Stone appeared on the German late-night talk show TV total, where she performed "Free Me", as well as a duet with Swiss singer Stefanie Heinzmann on the latter's single "Unbreakable". She later performed "Big Ol' Game" with Raphael Saadiq on The Tonight Show with Conan O'Brien on 20 January 2010. Stone performed "Stalemate" with Jamie Hartman of Ben's Brother on The Wendy Williams Show on 24 March 2010, on The Early Show on 25 March, on The Tonight Show with Jay Leno on 29 March and on The Late Late Show with Craig Ferguson on 2 April.

Conflict with EMI
In May 2009, it was reported that Stone was willing to forfeit £2 million to terminate her four-album deal with EMI due to her dissatisfaction with the label after it was taken over by private equity firm Terra Firma in 2007. EMI refused to release her from her contract and took legal action in return, claiming she was in breach of contract by failing to deliver the master tapes for the album.  Colour Me Free! was delayed once again until 20 October 2009. By January 2010, Stone's dispute with EMI had been settled.

The original cover art for Colour Me Free! features a black-and-white shot of Stone in a cage. An alternative cover, containing Stone's name and the album title against a purple background, was used for the North American release of the album. A representative for Stone said EMI insisted on switching the album art, while an EMI spokesperson claimed that Stone agreed to the purple text-only cover.

Critical reception

Colour Me Free! received generally positive reviews from music critics. At Metacritic, which assigns a normalised rating out of 100 to reviews from mainstream publications, the album received an average score of 67, based on seven reviews. Angus Batey of Yahoo! Music UK wrote that Stone "delivers a string of superlative performances full of technique, character and [...] heart-pounding, raw, emotive soul", concluding that despite its "moments of bonkers excess", the album "proves, again, Joss Stone's considerable worth." Graham Rockingham of Metro News Canada raved that the album has "a sonic depth that you can reach in and caress, which is something you can usually only find on old Stax or Muscle Shoals LPs. Yet Stone manages to merge her '60s leanings with more contemporary sounds". Dan Aquilante of the New York Post opined that on Colour Me Free!, Stone is "at her bluesy, soul-singer best", stating that her voice is "powerful" and "reminiscent of the energy Aretha [Franklin] brought to many of her early recordings". Steve Jones of USA Today commented that Stone "sings with more grit and gusto than a battalion of R&B princesses while taking a sledgehammer to pop conventions" and concluded that "[s]he's assertive, sassy and lets lovers know that they play with her heart at their own risk."

The Observers Hugh Montgomery called the album a "decent comeback" that "eschews [Stone's] last LP's hip-hop leanings for more straightforward retro soul funk", adding that "what most impresses is her voice, which has acquired emotional resonance to match its size." Jim Farber of the New York Daily News found that "the material on Free far outperforms that on earlier CDs" and noted that the album showcases "a far more stripped-down sound than before, which leaves more room for Stone's newly grounded vocals to shine." At Entertainment Weekly, Chris Willman viewed the first half of the album as "the best set of music [Stone has] done", while remarking that the second half "succumbs to R&B overproducers". Despite comparing Colour Me Free!s theme of "breaking free" to that of Introducing Joss Stone (2007), Stephen Thomas Erlewine of AllMusic stated that Stone's "raw vocal skills remain impressive, as does her taste in soul, and even if this feels off-kilter, not quite achieving a balance between retro and modernity, it does beat with a messy human heart, one that was subdued on Introducing". Colin McGuire of PopMatters praised opening track "Free Me" as "easily one of the best songs [Stone has] ever written", but expressed that "setting the bar that high that early on [...] create[s] a level of expectation that the rest of the album's tracks simply don't live up to." Mikael Wood of the Los Angeles Times opined that "Colour Me Free succeeds about as well as Stone's other records: It's quite good in the up-tempo bits [...] and a little soggy in the ballads." Jim DeRogatis of the Chicago Sun-Times felt that "the problem is that Stone doesn't really have a master plan, or the discerning ear to tell her best moments [...] from her worst".

Commercial performance
Colour Me Free! debuted at number 75 on the UK Albums Chart with first-week sales of 2,960 copies, becoming Stone's lowest-peaking album in the United Kingdom to date. As of July 2011, it had sold 14,071 copies in the UK. The album debuted at number 10 on the Billboard 200 with 27,000 copies sold in its first week. The album had sold 93,000 copies in the US by July 2011. Elsewhere, Colour Me Free! performed moderately on the charts, reaching number five in Switzerland, number 16 in the Netherlands, number 17 in Austria, number 25 in Portugal, and number 26 in Canada and Germany.

Track listing

Sample credits
 "Free Me" embodies portions of "Do the Dirt" by the Meters.

Personnel
Credits adapted from the liner notes of Colour Me Free!

Musicians

 Joss Stone – vocals ; background vocals 
 Pete Iannacone – bass 
 Lemar Carter – drums 
 Stanton Moore – drums 
 Bobby Ozuna – percussion ; additional percussion 
 Kenya Baker – guitar ; additional guitar 
 Hollie Farris – trumpet 
 Jeff Watkins – saxophone 
 Winston Rollins – trombone 
 Charlie Happiness – sitar, bass harmonica 
 Raphael Saadiq – bass ; featured artist, background vocals, bass, drums, guitar, percussion 
 Christian Lohr – Hammond ; keyboards ; piano 
 Jonathan Shorten – piano ; clavinet ; Wurlitzer ; Hammond 
 Paul Riser – string arrangements ; The Paul Riser Orchestra conductor 
 Jeff Beck – featured artist 
 Sheila E. – featured artist 
 Charles Jones – background vocals 
 Ellison Kendrick – background vocals 
 Conner Reeves – background vocals 
 Steven Grier – beatbox 
 Paula Mitchell – background vocals 
 Neville Malcolm – upright bass ; background vocals, guitar 
 Antonia Jenae – background vocals 
 Artia Lockett – background vocals 
 Nas – featured artist 
 Richie Stevens – background vocals ; drums 
 Marc "Makani" Cyril – background vocals, bass 
 Darren Abraham – background vocals, percussion 
 Rob Bacon – guitar solo 
 Pete Cherry – bass 
 Michael Bowes – percussion 
 Nikolaij Joel – guitar 
 Paddy Miller – keyboards 
 Tony Kofi – saxophone 
 Mellissa LaRochelle – background vocals 
 Latonya Shorter – background vocals 
 Abel Pabon – piano 
 David Sanborn – alto saxophone 
 Christian McBride – bass 
 Steve Gadd – drums 
 Russell Malone – guitar 
 Gil Goldstein – Rhodes 
 Ricky Pederson – Hammond 
 Keyon Harold – trumpet 
 Lew Soloff – trumpet 
 Mike Davis – tenor trombone 
 Lou Marini – tenor saxophone 
 Howard Johnson – baritone saxophone 
 Charles Pillow – bass clarinet 
 Jamie Hartman – vocals, 12-string guitar, synth strings, Rhodes 
 Malcolm Moore – bass 
 Karl Brazil – drums, percussion 
 Luke Potashnik – guitar 
 Kris Houston – piano 
 Sacha Skarbek – Rhodes 
 Morgan Visconti – string arrangements 
 James Poyser – piano 
 Anatoly Rosinsky – violin 
 Elizabeth Wilson – violin 
 Liane Mautner – violin 
 Robert Brosseau – violin 
 Amy Hershberger – violin 
 Armen Garabedian – violin 
 Sally Berman – violin 
 Joe Ketendjian – violin 
 Agnes Gottschewski – violin 
 Robert Berg – viola 
 Lynn Grants – viola 
 Karolina Naziemiec – viola 
 Sam Formicola – viola 
 Maurice Grants – cello 
 Miguel Martinez – cello 
 Vahe Hayrikian – cello 
 Mike Velerio – contrabass 
 Drew Dembowski – contrabass 
 Paul Baker – harp 
 Stephanie O'Keefe – horn 
 Dan Kelley – horn 
 Phil Yao – horn 
 John Yoakum – oboe, English horn 
 Patricia Cloud – flute, alto flute 
 Paul Sternhagen – percussion

Technical

 Joss Stone – production ; album coordination, executive production
 Jonathan Shorten – production ; recording, engineering 
 Conner Reeves – production 
 Jonathan Joseph – recording ; engineering 
 James Tanksley – additional recording 
 Chuck Brungardt – mixing ; engineering assistance ; recording, engineering 
 Marlon Marcel – engineering assistance 
 Paul Suarez – engineering assistance 
 Kenya Baker – recording, engineering 
 Gerry Brown – string recording 
 Sir Mychael Davison – additional recording, engineering assistance 
 Alan Branch – additional recording, engineering assistance 
 Raphael Saadiq – production 
 Bojan Dugic – recording 
 Jerry Smith – recording, engineering 
 Phil Ramone – production 
 Joe Ferla – recording, mixing 
 Sacha Skarbek – production 
 Jamie Hartman – production 
 Dyre Gormsen – recording 
 Pete Ibsen – recording 
 Iain Hill – engineering assistance 
 Ainsley Adams – engineering assistance 
 Jeremy Wheatley – mixing 
 Dan Mackenzie – production 
 Ryan Moys – additional recording, engineering assistance 
 Tom Coyne – mastering at Sterling Sound (New York City)
 Courtney Christian – album coordination
 Paul Conroy – album coordination
 Natasha Radford – album coordination

Charts

Release history

Notes

References

2009 albums
Albums produced by Phil Ramone
Albums produced by Raphael Saadiq
Joss Stone albums
Virgin Records albums